Ledumahadi (meaning "giant thunderclap" in Sesotho language) is a genus of lessemsaurid sauropodomorph dinosaur from the Early Jurassic Elliot Formation in Free State Province, South Africa. The type and only species is L. mafube, known from a singular incomplete postcranial specimen.

Description
Ledumahadi was likely a quadruped, as determined by analysis of the circumference of its humerus and femur compared to those of other dinosaurs. It would have had very large, robust forelimbs, consistent with those of its relatives. Unlike those of later sauropods, these limbs were naturally flexed, as opposed to being purely columnar.

Size

At its time in the Early Jurassic epoch, Ledumahadi is thought to have been the largest land animal that had ever lived. L. mafube was more comparable to the later sauropod Diplodocus in body mass.

Classification
A phylogenetic analysis of Ledumahadi mafube was performed by McPhee and colleagues, which found it to belong to a recently recognised clade of sauropodiformes called Lessemsauridae, including the closely related South African Antetonitrus and Lessemsaurus from Argentina. Another lessemsaurid described in 2018, Ingentia, could not be included in their analysis but was also recognised as belonging to Lessemsauridae. The results of McPhee and colleagues' analysis are shown in the cladogram below:

The size of the taxon was deemed to be important in the wider picture of sauropodomorph evolution, similar to its other lessemsaurid relatives. Living only a few million years after the Triassic-Jurassic extinction event, it indicates that this event must have either had only a small effect on body size within the sauropodomorph lineage, or may have not affected it at all. Significance was also found in the magnitude of the size itself—it lacked the columnar limbs that characterized its more derived relatives, thought to be a key adaptation in body size evolution. Ornithischian dinosaurs reach their largest sizes around a similar size of 12 to 17 tonnes in weight. This may have been the upper limit for dinosaurs without adopting the characteristics found in true sauropods, which grew to be several times the weight of Ledumahadi.

See also
 2018 in paleontology

References 

Sauropodomorphs
Early Jurassic dinosaurs of Africa
Hettangian genera
Sinemurian genera
Jurassic South Africa
Fossils of South Africa
Fossil taxa described in 2018